Governor Dalton may refer to:

John M. Dalton (1900–1972), 45th Governor of Missouri
John N. Dalton (1931–1986), 63rd Governor of Virginia